Pocodesmus greeni is a species of millipedes in the family Cryptodesmidae. It is endemic to Sri Lanka.

References

Polydesmida
Animals described in 1981
Millipedes of Asia
Endemic fauna of Sri Lanka
Arthropods of Sri Lanka